Suppin is the thirteenth studio album by Japanese J-pop singer and songwriter Maki Ohguro. It was released on 25 August 2010 under new label 32 Records.

This album consist of two previously released singles, "Our Home" and "It's All Right".

The album is released in two formats: regular CD edition and limited CD+DVD edition. DVD disc consist of live footages, music video clip of It's All Right and self liner notes.

The album reached No. 29 in its first week on the Oricon chart. The album charted four weeks and sold 7,000 copies.

This is her the last studio album before a six-year hiatus.

In 2016, she returns with a compilation album Greatest Hits 1991-2016 ~All Singles +~ under the Being Inc. label.

Track listing

In media
It's All Right: ending theme for Tokyo Broadcasting System Television Hiru Obi!

References

Japanese-language albums
2009 albums
Maki Ohguro albums